Iron Heights Penitentiary is a fictional setting in the , a maximum-security prison which houses the many Flash rogues and superhuman criminals of Keystone City and Central City when captured. Iron Heights first appeared in Flash: Iron Heights (2001).

Fictional history
Located about three miles north of Keystone City, Iron Heights Penitentiary is known for its vicious and brutal treatment of its prisoners. Under the ruthless authority of the current Warden, Gregory Wolfe, a former prosecutor of St. Louis, Iron Heights has become a living "hell-hole" to those in the prison. Possessing a personal hatred for the supervillains, Wolfe instituted a lockdown system in the building, and guards were ordered to shoot any prisoner on sight if they were trying to escape or caught outside the prison. Also, the prisoners were beaten on a daily basis. Wolfe has the superhuman ability to tense up others' muscles, which he uses on the prisoners, guards, and even the Flash, making them suffer cramps or discomfort that force them to halt until his power dissipates.

The supervillain prisoners are jailed in an area known as "the Pipeline." The Pipeline is the dark, dank basement of Iron Heights where the prisoners are treated under awful living conditions with little food or water. The prisoners are kept in their costumes so the guards can identify them immediately. Guards have orders to shoot any "mask" spotted outside the Pipeline.

Despite these harsh conditions and the ruthless warden, breakouts have occurred in Iron Heights. A riot occurred when a virus was released in the prison by Murmur, with Blacksmith's help. The viral outbreak ended up killing guards and prisoners. Murmur and Pipeline prisoners Weather Wizard and Girder escaped.

Gorilla Grodd also escaped when he controlled gorillas to break him loose from his confinement, the subsequent attack triggering a mass breakout as all the other cells in the Pipeline were opened as well.

The Outsiders once broke into Iron Heights in order to rescue Black Lightning. Everything did not go as planned, and eventually the prisoners were able to use their abilities again. Massive riots broke out and Wolfe led the riot squad in trying to round everyone up. As Wolfe tried to apprehend the Outsiders using his powers, Shift released gases into the air to counteract it. As a result, Wolfe had a breakdown and increased the intensity of his power. In doing so, he killed 44 people, not including the Outsiders, who were protected by Shift.

During the "Blackest Night" event, Iron Heights becomes a battleground between the Rogues and their deceased members, who are reanimated as undead members of the Black Lantern Corps.

Staff
 Gregory Wolfe - Warden

Known inmates

Here are the known inmates of Iron Heights:

 Black Lightning
 Blacksmith
 Captain Boomerang
 Captain Cold
 Clay Parker
 Cicada
 Doctor Alchemy
 Double Down
 Eobard Thawne
 Fallout
 Girder
 Godspeed
 Gorilla Grodd
 Trickster (James Jesse)
 Murmur 
 Peek-a-Boo
 Pied Piper
 Tar Pit
 Top
 Weather Wizard

In other media

Television
 Iron Heights appears in the Batman: The Brave and the Bold animated series. Some of its inmates include Gorilla Grodd (in human form), Black Manta, Clock King, False-Face, Felix Faust, Kite Man, Mad Hatter, Jarvis Kord, Clock King's henchmen Tick and Tock, and characters from the 1960s Batman series (Archer, Black Widow, Bookworm, Louie the Lilac, Egghead, King Tut, Ma Parker, Shame, and Siren).
 The Arrowverse shows Arrow and The Flash use Iron Heights as the state prison that both Oliver Queen / Green Arrow and Barry Allen / The Flash use to house criminals from Starling/Star City and Central City. Iron Heights has been shown housing Moira Queen while she was awaiting her trial and Henry Allen after he was convicted of murdering his wife in addition to the many criminals that Green Arrow and The Flash hav than Central as it was affected by Malcolm Merlyn's earthquake device from season one and was later completely rebuilt in season two. Aside from the earthquake, Iron Heights is described as being poorly managed as guards have been observed taking bribes and aiding an assassination within the prison and escapes and riots seem to happen. Laurel Lance later states that there is no such thing as protective custody in Iron Heights, although it did have a secure wing set aside for the Trickster as he was considered too dangerous for regular containment.
 As revealed in The Flash, Iron Heights was initially incapable of housing metahumans and the remnant of the Labs' particle accelerator served as a makeshift prison for metahuman criminals while S.T.A.R. Labs work on reversing their mutations. By season two, the public acceptance of metahumans has resulted in a new wing being established for metahuman prisoners. During season four, Barry Allen is incarcerated at Iron Heights when is accused of murdering Clifford DeVoe. During his time at Iron Heights, Barry discovers that Warden Gregory Wolfe is selling imprisoned metahumans to Amunet Black. After Wolfe is killed by DeVoe and Barry is cleared of all charges, Del Toro takes over as the new warden and looks to clear the name of Iron Heights following her predecessor's corruption. Season five shows Eobard Thawne being incarcerated at Iron Heights' death row in 2049. Thawne later kills the guards and attempts to kill the warden but stopped by Flash and Nora Allen.
 In the Legends of Tomorrow episode "Slay Anything", it was revealed that Freddy Meyers was on death row at Iron Heights Penitentiary where he took the blame of his mother Kathy's serial killing activities as the Prom Night Slasher. When Freddy was executed by the electric charge, Kathy died to a heart attack enabling Astra Logue to encore her. Once Kathy's activities were thwarted in the past, Freddy's sentence to death row at Iron Heights Penitentiary was erased from the timeline.
 Iron Heights Penitentiary appears in the Scooby-Doo and Guess Who? episode "One Minute Mysteries." This is where Flash incarcerates the villains who operated as the Scooby-Doo villains Miner Forty-Niner from "Mine Your Own Business", the Ghost of Captain Cutler from "A Clue for Scooby-Doo", the Spooky Space Kook from its self-titled episode, the Snow Ghost from "That's Snow Ghost", the Ghost of Redbeard from "Go Away Ghost Ship", the Black Knight from "What a Night for a Knight", the Witch from "Which Witch is Which", the Witch Doctor from "Decoy for a Dognapper", the Phantom from "Hassle in the Castle", Charlie the Robot from "Foul Play in Funland", and The Creeper from "Jeepers, It's the Creeper!" Upon his defeat, Trickster is remanded to Iron Heights Penitentiary by Flash where Trickster compliments Mr. Carswell's Creeper costume.

Film
Iron Heights Penitentiary appears in the DC Extended Universe. It is first shown on screen in Justice League, when Barry Allen visits his incarcerated father. A sign inside Iron Heights indicates it is located within Central City, Ohio.

Video game
Iron Heights Penitentiary appears in the Season of Infamy DLC from Batman: Arkham Knight. This version of Iron Heights is still a prison, but in a form of an airship that crashed down in the bay of Bleake Island near Panessa Studios. It is here that Batman fights Killer Croc and learns that Warden Ranken did experiments on him. Gorilla Grodd's name was seen on one of the cells.

See also
 Arkham Asylum
 Belle Reve
 Blackgate Penitentiary
 Stryker's Island

References

External links
 Hyperborea entry on Iron Heights

DC Comics locations
Fictional prisons
Flash (comics)